is a 1992 song by the Japanese band The Boom. It was written by the lead singer, Kazufumi Miyazawa, based on his impressions from visiting Okinawa for a photo shoot. It is the band's best selling song, well known throughout Japan and Argentina, and one of the most widely known songs associated with Okinawa although the band members are all from Yamanashi Prefecture. The song uses a mix of modern pop and rock styles as well as min'yō. Okinawan musical instruments and Okinawan vocabulary have been incorporated into the song.

The song itself was used in an advertising campaign for the Xi brand awamori.

Origin
In a 2003 interview for fRoots, Miyazawa explained that he got the idea for the song after speaking with Okinawan survivors of the US invasion of Okinawa during World War II.

In another interview, Miyazawa explained that most Okinawan casualties were not caused by American troops, but by Japan's instructions to commit suicide rather than surrender.

While the song does not specify who the people being separated are, Miyazawa stated in the 2002 interview, "It is about the separation of a man and a woman, a separation that they couldn't control, and didn't want."

Okinawan influence
In fact, the term shima-uta originally refers to traditional folk songs of the Amami Islands. It is not a native term of Okinawa but was introduced from Amami in the 1970s. Uehara Naohiko, Okinawa's influential radio personality and songwriter, borrowed the term from Amami and give a new meaning to the term. He used his radio programs and musical events to popularize the name of shima-uta in Okinawa.

Miyazawa first heard Okinawan-influenced music from Haruomi Hosono in the 1970s. Later, he asked friends to bring him tapes from the island, as Okinawan music was not readily available in Japan. Miyazawa said in the 2003 interview,

Miyazawa plays the sanshin, the Okinawan precursor to the shamisen, when singing "Shima Uta" in concert.

Release history
There were initially two versions of "Shima Uta" released by The Boom. The  followed on June 21, 1993, and is sung entirely in Japanese, although some words from Okinawan remain (such as ウージ uuji, which means sugarcane ). These versions of the song were performed at the 44th annual Kōhaku Uta Gassen.

The Boom periodically re-released "Shima Uta", first on October 5, 2001, as a rearranged version as a double A-side to their song "Kamisama no Hōseki de Dekita Shima" which was later remixed for the band's 2002 album Okinawa: Watashi no Shima. 2002 also saw the release of a new "Shima Uta" single on May 22 which included vocals from Argentine vocalist Alfredo Casero who became famous in his own right for his cover of the song. The Boom with Casero performed this version at the 53rd Kōhaku Uta Gassen. On March 20, 2013, The Boom released a new 20th anniversary version of the song and single.

Music video
The music video for "Shima Uta" was filmed on Okinawa Prefecture's Taketomi Island, with Taketomi Village's "traditional Okinawan" houses featured prominently along with local flora and fauna. For the 20th anniversary version, The Boom returned to Taketomi and filmed local residents, as well as some other notable residents of Okinawa Prefecture, lip syncing the song with Miyazawa's vocals.

Cover versions
The song has been covered by many artists, including Gackt, Rimi Natsukawa, Tokiko Kato, Alfredo Casero, Plastiko, Diana King, Andrew W.K., Willy Sabor and Allister.

Gackt
The Gackt's version features taiko drums, traditional dancers and singers, and China Sadao as sanshin player/min'yō singer.

Alfredo Casero
The 2001 version by Casero won three awards at Premios Gardel, the "Argentine Grammy Awards."  In 2002 the Casero version was voted the theme song for the Argentina football (soccer) team's 2002 FIFA World Cup. A Japanese football fan club, Ultras Nippon, also used Shima Uta as their theme song. "Shima Uta" was the first  Argentine hit song to be sung entirely in Japanese. It stayed on the top of the charts for six months. Miyazawa and Casero sing together in concert when Miyazawa tours Brazil and Argentina.

Andrew W.K.
American musician Andrew W.K. recorded his own version of the song for his album The Japan Covers.  It uses the same translation as Izzy Cooper used in her versions, adding the dedication line at the end.  He performs the song over synthesizers.

Allister
Shima Uta can be found on the Japanese version of the 2005 album Before the Blackout, performed in Japanese.

References

External links

島歌 (Shima Uta) / Island song, lyrics in English

1992 songs
Japanese songs
Songs written by Kazufumi Miyazawa